Ninghua is a county of the prefecture-level city of Sanming, in western Fujian province, People's Republic of China, bordering Jiangxi to the west. The town of Shibi of Ninghua is well known as the cradle of the Hakka. Ninghua is also marked as the starting place of the famous massive Long March undertaken by the Red Army of the Chinese Communist Party in 1934.

Administration
The county government is located in Cuijiang town. There are four other towns, namely Quanshang, Hucun and Shibi Caofang. All four lie along a single east-west highway which transects Ninghua and connects the Mingxi County with National Highway 206 in Jiangxi Province.

There are twelve sub-townships, making a total of 16 township-level divisions in Ninghua:   
Chengjiao (adjoining Cuijiang, the county seat), Anyuan, Shuixi, Helong, Zhongsha, Jicun, Huaitu, Fangtian, Zhiping, Caofang, Anle and Chengnan.

Climate

Transportation 
The area is served by Ninghua railway station.

References

 
County-level divisions of Fujian
Sanming